George Davidson Todd (April 19, 1856 – November 23, 1929) was Mayor of Louisville, Kentucky from 1896 to 1897.

Early life
George D. Todd was born on April 19, 1856, in Frankfort, Kentucky. His descendants were early settlers of Kentucky, and his father, Harry Innes Todd, was a two-term sheriff of Franklin County, Kentucky as well as state prison trustee and warden.

Career
George Davidson Todd came to Louisville at age 18 to work for the W.B. Belknap hardware company, later known as Belknap Hardware and Manufacturing Company. He started his own company, the Todd-Donigan Iron Company, in 1880.

He served as treasurer of the state Republican Party. Todd became the first republican elected Mayor of Louisville (Robert Emmet King had served as mayor pro tem for two weeks) in 1896. Todd finished out the term of Democrat Henry S. Tyler who had died in office. His term as mayor was complicated by a split within his own party over political appointments, and he lost his bid for re-election in 1897. Todd was a delegate to the 1896 Republican National Convention.

After his term as mayor he returned to his iron company and moved to New Albany, Indiana in the 1920s. Todd was president of the National Hame and Chain Company.

Personal life
Todd had three children: George, Laura and Mrs. W. A. Barbee.

Todd died on November 23, 1929, at his home in New Albany. He was interred in Frankfort.

References

External links

1856 births
1929 deaths
Mayors of Louisville, Kentucky
Kentucky Republicans
People from Frankfort, Kentucky